Thomas Martin Dumont (born January 11, 1968)  is an American guitarist and producer.  Dumont is a member of third wave ska band No Doubt, and during the band's hiatus, he began Invincible Overlord as a side project and produced Matt Costa's Songs We Sing.

Life and career
Born in Los Angeles, California, the Dumont family lived in Irvine, California. Tom was the only adopted child in his family and has two siblings.  Dumont's father, who played the piano, gave his son a guitar at age twelve. Dumont practiced by strumming folk songs by the likes of James Taylor. Dumont was influenced by heavy metal bands such as Iron Maiden, Judas Priest and KISS.  He joined his older sister's heavy metal band Rising, but left in 1988 for third wave ska band No Doubt. He has one sister named Gina and a brother named John.

Dumont studied music theory for five semesters at Orange Coast College but dropped out when he had to learn classical guitar, which was something he disliked.  When the band moved into a house on Beacon Avenue in Anaheim, he wrote a poem about being addicted to television.  He took the poem to Eric Stefani, who put the poem to music and came up with the song "Trapped in a Box".  The song was recorded for the band's self-titled debut album and was the album's only single.

The band later self-released The Beacon Street Collection in March 1995.  The same month, Dumont left his job as a file clerk at a mortgage company.  He had "a good feeling" about having finished recording Tragic Kingdom and planned to fall back on promoting rock concerts if the album was not successful.  Tragic Kingdom became a commercial success, certified diamond in the United States and selling sixteen million copies worldwide.  When Eric left the band, Tom, along with bandmates Gwen Stefani and Tony Kanal, took leadership in writing and composing responsibilities.

After the Tragic Kingdom tour, Tom returned to his home in Long Beach, California and started surfing in 1997.  Dumont is a member of The Surfrider Foundation, an environmental organization to preserve coastal life.  Since Eric Stefani left, Tom Dumont, Tony Kanal and Gwen Stefani became No Doubt's primary songwriters.

During No Doubt's hiatus, Dumont produced Matt Costa's 2005 debut album, titled Songs We Sing, after hearing a demo tape by Costa.

Reunion with No Doubt

With Stefani promoting her second solo album, No Doubt began initial work on a new album without her and planned to complete it after Stefani's tour was finished.  In March 2008, the band started making posts concerning the progression of the album on their official fan forum.  Stefani made a post on March 28, 2008 stating that songwriting had commenced but was slow on her end because she was, at the time, pregnant with her second child.

Manager Jim Guerinot said the yet-untitled album is being produced by Mark "Spike" Stent, who helped produce and mix Rock Steady. Between Stefani's pregnancy and recording, No Doubt did not tour in 2008, but Guerinot promised, they plan to hit the road hard in 2009 for their first full-fledged band tour in nearly five years.

No Doubt announced on their official website that they will tour in the summer of 2009 with Paramore, The Sounds, Janelle Monáe, Bedouin Soundclash, Katy Perry, and Panic! at the Disco. while finishing their upcoming album, which was set to be released in 2010 but has been delayed. Tickets for the tour went on sale March 7, 2009. As a special promotion for the tour, the band is giving away their entire music catalog free as a digital download with purchase of top tier seating.

In 2009, No Doubt made an appearance on the television series Gossip Girl, playing a fictional band called "Snowed Out" in the episode "Valley Girls". They performed their cover version of the Adam and the Ants song "Stand and Deliver".

Personal life
Dumont and his wife Mieke have three sons together: Ace Joseph Dumont, born April 6, 2006, Rio Atticus Dumont, born June 18, 2008, and Koa Thomas Dumont, born February 19, 2011.  According to the band's record label representative, the couple was married in October 2004.

According to his No Doubt band mates, when Dumont drinks alcohol he shifts into his alter ego nicknamed "The Douche".

Dumont is an avid traveler, spending a good part of his free time on the road, he has been spotted in remote areas of the world with his wife and kids.

Equipment
Dumont is endorsed by Hamer Guitars and favors vintage MXR effect pedals. During live performances, he uses Kemper modeling amplifiers, but has also used Divided by Thirteen, Soldano, Vox, Matchless, Fender, and Silvertone amplifiers while recording. He uses Ernie Ball Regular Slinky strings.

Guitars
 Hamer Standard natural finish
 Hamer Vector
 Hamer Korina Standard
 Hamer Korina Junior
 Hamer Newport
 Hamer Newport with hum buckers

Effects
MXR Phase 90
MXR Phase 100
MXR Blue Box
MXR Micro Amp
MXR Auto Q
MXR Bass Octave Deluxe
Dunlop Cry Baby Wah
Dan-Echo
Eventide Time Factor
Eventide Mod Factor
Malekko Ekko 616
Tone Freak Effects Buff Puff
Tone Freak Effects Naked OD

Amplifiers
Divided by 13 RSA 31 Heads
Divided by 13 4x12 Cabinets equipped with 16ohm Celestion G12M Greenbacks.
Soldano SLO 100
Matchless Clubman 35
Fender Pro Junior

References

External links
Official website
Dumont's weblog
Invincible Overlord - Dumont's independent musical project with collaborator, Ted Matson

No Doubt members
1968 births
Living people
American rock guitarists
American male guitarists
Musicians from Anaheim, California
People from Irvine, California
American adoptees
Guitarists from Los Angeles
20th-century American guitarists
Dreamcar members